Birgersson is a Swedish surname. Notable people with the surname include:

Knut Birgersson, Riksjarl of Sweden (died 1208)
Magnus Birgersson ( 1240 –1290)
Oscar Birgersson (born 2000), Swedish ice hockey player

See also

 Birger
 Birgir
 Birgerson
 Birgisson
 

Swedish-language surnames